The Church and monastery of El Carmen Alto is a Catholic complex of convent, church and chapels built in the historic center of the city of Quito, capital of Ecuador, on calle García Moreno, formerly known as De las Siete Cruces, on the corner of Rocafuerte.

History
Its construction began in the last decade of the 16th century, since by the year 1618 Mariana de Jesús de Paredes, who would later become the first Catholic saint in Ecuador, was born there. After his death in 1645, the house passed into the hands of the Order of Discalced Carmelites, who already occupied it in 1647, although it was only on February 4, 1653, that they converted it into a cloistered monastery with the name of "El Carmen" de San José", which is its official name.

The name "Carmen Alto" was popularized when a group of nuns from the same order was forced to settle in Quito after the destruction of their monastery in Latacunga, in the earthquake of 1698, but due to a rule that prohibited more than 21 veiled nuns in each monastery had to establish another house in the San Juan neighborhood, receiving the name "El Carmen Nuevo or Bajo", while the one that previously existed in the city took the name "El Carmen Antiguo or Alto".

Features
In Carmen Alto there are beautiful altarpieces, in carved wood, gilded and with mirrors and small sculptures, the work of the most famous artists of the colonial Quito School. One of his most important works is the life-size "Transit of the Virgin" surrounded by 14 images.

Museum opening
Since 2013, the two oldest cloisters of the convent were reopened, including the original house of Mariana de Jesús, so that a museum would function there that would allow the exhibition of the pieces collected by the Order of Discalced Carmelites throughout the centuries. Part of the pictorial collection includes paintings by Hernando de la Cruz, Joaquín Pinto and Víctor Mideros. The set was adapted for museum purposes and the spaces necessary for the life of the 21 cloistered nuns who currently inhabit it were sealed,​ although it always has applicants to enter.

Gallery

See also
List of buildings in Quito

References

Roman Catholic churches in Quito
Roman Catholic churches completed in 1653
16th-century establishments in the Spanish Empire
Baroque church buildings in Ecuador

es:Iglesia de El Carmen Alto (Quito)